Daniela Chmet (born 4 August 1979), is an Italian professional triathlete, 2007 National Sprint Champion and Biathle World Champion of the years 2002, 2003, 2004, 2005, and 2009.

Biography
In the seven years from 2004 to 2010, Daniela Chmet took part in 32 ITU competitions and achieved six top ten positions.
In 2006, she won the Team World Championships in Cancun together with Nadia Cortassa and Beatrice Lanza.
In 2008, Chmet replaced Nadia Cortassa, who had to withdraw because of a hip fracture, in the Beijing Olympics, but she could not finish the race.

Chmet represents the police sports club G.S. Fiamme Oro which, however, has neither a high performance center in Trieste nor a triathlon section.

ITU Competitions 
In the seven years from 2004 to 2010 Chmet took part in 33 ITU competitions and achieved 6 top ten positions.
The following list is based upon the official ITU rankings and the Athlete's Profile Page.
Unless indicated otherwise the following competitions are triathlons (Olympic Distance) and belong to the Elite category.

BG = the sponsor British Gas · DNF = did not finish · DNS = did not start

Notes

External links
 
 Daniela Chmet at Fiamme Oro
 Italian Triathlon Federation

Italian female triathletes
Living people
1979 births
Triathletes of Fiamme Oro